(literally: 'church duty') was a historical form of punishment, practiced in Sweden-Finland. It was a form of public humiliation in which the condemned was made to confess and repent of their crime before being rehabilitated and spared further punishments. It could be sentenced by the church or by a secular court, and performed by the church. The concept of "church duty" thus does not have anything to do with an obligation to go to church, in spite of the name (kyrkogångsplikt, literally 'church attendance obligation').

History
The  originated from the confession and repentance within the Catholic church during the Middle Ages: after having committed a more serious crime, the criminal was cast out of their parish congregation, and was only rehabilitated after having repented of their sin.

In the Swedish Church Ordinance 1571,  consisted of the corporal punishments meted out within the sphere of public humiliation, such as pillorying, the stocks, corporal punishment and similar punishments, or fines. The punishment could be meted out by both the church as well as by a secular court, who both had the right to handle criminals.

On 4 May 1855,  and all forms of public humiliation were abolished in Sweden. In Finland, the same reform was introduced in 1864.

Uppenbar kyrkoplikt

By the reform of 1741,  was abolished for sex outside of marriage. All sexual acts outside of marriage were formally illegal, but as an illegal sexual act was normally only exposed when it resulted in pregnancy, and the male party could deny having engaged in the act while the participation of the pregnant female in the act was undeniable;  was in practice mostly used upon unmarried mothers.  This was viewed as a problem in the Riksdag of the Estates, because the social stigma caused by 's way of exposing the women, who felt themselves socially branded, was found to be a significant cause of infanticide performed by unmarried women desperate to do anything to avoid having their reputation ruined by the shame. Despite opposition from the clergy,  was abolished for sexual crimes in an attempt to prevent infanticide. This reform was followed by the Barnamordsplakatet in 1778.

Enskild kyrkoplikt
 (literally: 'private church duty') meant that the criminal was made to confess and repent in the sacristy, before or after service, in private before the priest and only a handful of witnesses selected by the priest.

This was used for the crime of sex outside of marriage, as well as minor crimes such as insignificant forms of theft.

References

 Nordisk familjebok / 1800-talsutgåvan. 9. Kristendomen - Lloyd
 Carlquist, Gunnar, red (1933). Svensk uppslagsbok. Bd 16. Malmö: Svensk Uppslagsbok AB. Sid. 496

Punishments
Social history of Sweden
Social history of Finland
Legal history of Sweden
1571 in Sweden
1686 in Sweden
1741 in Sweden
1855 in Sweden
1864 in Finland
Religion and politics
Criminal law